The Beardmore W.B.1a was a British two-seater long-distance bomber biplane of World War I developed by Beardmore. The pilot and observer were seated in the rear of the fuselage, just before the tail section.

Specifications

References

1910s British bomber aircraft
W.B.1a
Biplanes